Lawrence Underwood (1871 – February 2, 1939) was an American stage and screen actor, writer, and director. He played in many movies, including Old Lady 31, The Phantom Buster and King of the Royal Mounted.

Selected filmography
 Galloping On (1925)
 Twisted Triggers (1926)

References

External links
Lawrence Underwood on IMDb

1871 births
1939 deaths
People from Albia, Iowa
Male actors from Iowa
American male stage actors
Male actors from Los Angeles
20th-century American male actors